Imli may refer to:

Tamarind, a fruit
International Maritime Law Institute, a school in Malta

See also
Imlie, a 2020 Hindi TV series